Le Cellier is a commune in the Loire-Atlantique department in western France.

Population

Sights
The commune lies on the north bank of the river Loire; this spot offers magnificent views.

The Château de Clermont, built between 1643 and 1649 by the Chenu, an old French family, was acquired by the Maupassant family. At the end of his life, the actor Louis de Funès came to live in the castle, which had been inherited by his wife, a descendant of the Maupassants.

In 2013 the mansion became a museum dedicated to Funes.
The banks of the Loire were also visited by the poet René-Guy Cadou or the painter William Turner.

The Folies-Siffait are strange vestiges of architecture from the nineteenth century, hanging gardens overlooking the Loire River.

References

See also
Communes of the Loire-Atlantique department

Communes of Loire-Atlantique